The 2007 PDC Pro Tour was a series of non-televised darts tournaments organised by the Professional Darts Corporation (PDC). They consisted of Professional Dart Players Association (PDPA) Players Championships and UK Open Regional Finals.

Prize money

Players championships
(All matches – Best of 5 sets, Best of 3 legs per set)

Stan James Players Championship at the Queensway Club, Gibraltar on 20 January

Final  Raymond van Barneveld 3–1 Adrian Lewis  (2–0, 2–1, 0–2, 2–0)

StanJames.com Players Championship at the Queensway Club, Gibraltar on 21 January

Final  Andy Hamilton 3–1 Colin Lloyd  (2–0, 2–0, 1–2, 2–0)

Partypoker.net Players Championship at the Ramada Hotel, Bad Soden, Frankfurt on 24 March

Final  Raymond van Barneveld 3–1 Ronnie Baxter  (2–0, 2–0, 1–2, 2–0)

Antwerp Darts Trophy (Players Championship) in Antwerp on 15 April

Final  Terry Jenkins 3–1 Colin Lloyd  (0–2, 2–0, 2–1, 2–1)

Open Holland Masters (Players Championship) in Schiedam on 29 April

Final  Peter Manley 3–0 James Wade  (2–1, 2–0, 2–0)

Thialf Darts Trophy (Players Championship) in Heerenveen on 3 June

Players Championship at Hayling Island on 16 June

Players Championship at Hayling Island on 17 June

Players Championship at Mandalay Bay Resort and Casino, Las Vegas, Nevada on 1 July

Final  Raymond van Barneveld 3–2 Terry Jenkins  (2–1, 0–2, 2–0, 1–2, 2–1)

Bobby Bourne Memorial Players Championship at Winter Gardens, Blackpool, on 21 July

Final  Phil Taylor 3–1 Adrian Lewis  (2–0, 1–2, 2–0, 2–0)

Peachtree Open (Players Championship) in Atlanta, Georgia, on 26 August

Ireland Open Classic (Players Championship) at the Royal Hotel, Castlebar, County Mayo on 9 September

Final  Denis Ovens 3–0 Colin Osborne  (2–1, 2–1, 2–1)

Windy City Open (Players Championship) at the Holiday Inn, Chicago, Illinois on 16 September

Players Championship at the Newport Centre, Newport on 22 September

Final  Raymond van Barneveld 3–0 Alex Roy  (2–1, 2–1, 2–0)

Players Championship at the City West Hotel, Dublin on 6 October

Players Championship at the Magnum Centre, Irvine on 20 October

Final  Andy Smith 3–0 James Wade  (2–1, 2–0, 2–1)

Players Championship at the SeePark, Kirchheim on 27 October

Final  Wayne Mardle 3–1 James Wade  (2–0, 1–2, 2–0, 2–1)

John McEvoy Gold Dart Classic (Players Championship) at National Events Centre in Killarney on 4 November

Final  Jelle Klaasen 3–2 Vincent van der Voort  (1–2, 1–2, 2–0, 2–1, 2–1)

Players Championship at Golden Tulip Hotel in Lisse on 10 November.

Final  Phil Taylor 3–0 Chris Mason  (2–1, 2–0, 2–0)

Players Championship at Golden Tulip Hotel in Lisse on 11 November.

Final  Phil Taylor 3–2 Raymond van Barneveld  (1–2, 2–1, 2–1, 1–2, 2–0)

UK Open Regional Finals
(Quarter-finals best of 9 legs)
(Semi-finals and Finals best of 3 sets, 5 legs per set)

Three of the eight 2007 UK Open qualifying events took place during 2006.

Blue Square UK Open Welsh Regional Final on 24 September 2006

Blue Square UK Open Irish Regional Final on 22 October 2006

Blue Square UK Open Scottish Regional Final on 5 November 2006

Blue Square UK Open North-East Regional Final at Park Hotel, Tynemouth on 6 January 2007

Final  Raymond van Barneveld 2–0 Roland Scholten  (3–0, 3–1)

Blue Square UK Open South-West Regional Final at the Talbot Inn, Keynsham on 11 February

Final  Dennis Priestley 2–0 James Wade  (3–2, 3–0)

Blue Square UK Open Southern Regional Final at the Torch, Wembley, North London on 4 March

Final  Phil Taylor 2–0 Wayne Mardle  (3–2, 3–0)

Blue Square UK Open North-West Regional Final at Bigwigs, Sale, Greater Manchester on 18 March

Final  James Wade 2–0 Terry Jenkins  (3–0, 3–1)

Blue Square UK Open Midlands Regional Final at the Festival, Trowell, Nottingham on 1 April

Final  Andy Hamilton 2–0 James Wade  (3–2, 3–1)

German Darts Corporation

The German Darts Corporation rankings are calculated from events across Germany, Austria and Switzerland. The top player in the rankings automatically qualifies for the 2008 World Championship.

Australian Grand Prix Pro Tour

The Australian Grand Prix rankings are calculated from events across Australia. The top player in the rankings automatically qualifies for the 2008 World Championship.

Other PDC tournaments
The PDC also held a number of other tournaments during 2007. These were mainly smaller events with low prize money, and some had eligibility restrictions. All of these tournaments were non-ranking.

External links
2007 PDC Calendar

Pdc Pro Tour, 2007
PDC Pro Tour